Dicliptera resupinata, the Arizona foldwing, is a perennial plant in the family (Acanthaceae) native to higher areas of southeastern Arizona into Mexico. Host to the Texas crescentspot (Anthanassa texana).

Characteristics
Growth Habit: Herb/forb.
Height: To 2 feet (61 cm) tall.
Flowering Season: Spring, Summer, and early Fall.

Inflorescence and fruit
The inflorescence is a pinkish violet flower surrounded by pairs of large, heart-shaped, green bracts, usually occurring in groups of 3.

References

Acanthaceae